Semniomima fuscivenalis is a moth in the family Crambidae. It was described by Schaus in 1920. It is found in Peru.

The wingspan is about 23 mm. The forewings are dull greyish brown, without any markings, except for brownish fuscous accentuation of the veins. The hindwings are brownish fuscous, with black accentuation of the veins.

References

Moths described in 1920
Pyraustinae